Alexandros Koumoundouros (4 February 1815 – 26 February 1883) was a Greek politician. Born in Kampos, on the Messenian side of the Mani Peninsula, he was the son of Spyridon-Galanis Koumoundouros, the bey of the area during the last period of the administration of the region by the Ottoman Empire.

He was a political personality famous for his work towards national progress, his patriotism and unselfishness, despite him having been in office during a very unsettled period of Greek history.

Biography 

After the Greek War of Independence, he moved to Nafplion where he went to school, then to Athens to study law. In 1841, he took part in the revolution in Crete despite believing it was a lost cause—the conditions were not right for such an undertaking at that time.

Koumoundouros’ long career encompassed many facets of political life, including serving in parliament, authoring of legislation, promotion of a democratic regime, restoration of the army, distribution of national farms to landless farmers, and the approval of major construction work (such as the Isthmus of Corinth).

During his 50-year-long period of political involvement he tried to remain neutral, and to avoid confrontation both with the three Great Powers and with the smaller powers of that time. In this period he held various ministerial appointments eighteen times, was twice president of the Greek Parliament and ten times Prime Minister of Greece. Despite often experiencing inimical conditions, including at least three assassination attempts, he still managed to create a firm foundation for democracy in Greece.

Early political career 
He was appointed as Public Prosecutor in the Tribunal of Kalamata, but he soon quit this position in order to become a politician. His first political distinction emerged in 1853 when he was elected deputy of the province of Messinia (the province of Kalamàta). Two years later he became President of the Greek Parliament, and the following year Minister of Economics.

He kept the same ministry in the new governments both of 1857 and 1859. After the overthrow of King Otto in 1862 he became Minister of Justice of the temporary government.

The first elections for a proper government after the fall of King Otto took place in 1863 and Koumoundouros remained as Minister of Justice, however, the extremely poor political stability lead to new elections the following year.

In the succeeding government of 1864, Koumoundouros was moved to the Ministry of Religion and Education and later to the Ministry of Internal Affairs.

Tenure as Prime Minister 
On 25 March 1865, he became Prime Minister of Greece for the first time and won the elections of 1866, too. Four years later, he retained the position of the Minister of Army and Internal Affairs, in addition to being Prime Minister. In 1875, Koumoundouros was successful in uniting all other parliamentary parties against Charilaos Trikoupis. In August 1875, he became President of the Parliament once again and in the elections of the same year he was made Prime Minister of the country once more.

Elections took place three times in 1876 and Koumoundouros was victorious in two of them. He also won the elections of 1878.

Koumoundouros’ greatest achievement came in 1881, during his last (tenth) premiership, when after the Congress of Berlin and after diplomatic contacts with the Ottomans, he managed to bring about the annexation of the areas of Thessaly and Arta to the Greek mainland (with the Convention of Constantinople).

Right after this achievement he called for new elections so that representatives of the newly annexed regions could enter Parliament. Despite this concession, the new candidates elected the representative of the opposition party as President of Parliament. As a result, Koumoundouros resigned on 3 March 1882. He died some months later on 26 February 1883, in his home on Ludwig Square (now known as Koumoundourou Square), in Athens, and was buried at public expense in the First Cemetery of Athens.

Personal life 
After the end of the unsuccessful Cretan revolution, he married Ekaterìni Konstantinou G. Mavromichàli of the famed Maniot family. They had two children. His first son Konstantìnos, was born in Kalamata 1846, and daughter Marìa, was born in Kalamata 1845. Ekaterìni died young and Koumoundouros married Efthimìa Perotì who presented him with his second son in 1858, Spirìdonas and in 1867 a daughter, Olga.

See also 
 Greek War of Independence
 Charilaos Trikoupis

References

Notes 
Other spellings of his name are: Kumunduros and Komunduros. Consult Bikélas, Coumoundouros, (Montpelier, 1884).

1817 births
1883 deaths
19th-century prime ministers of Greece
Greek nationalists
Foreign ministers of Greece
Prime Ministers of Greece
History of Greece (1863–1909)
Ministers of National Education and Religious Affairs of Greece
Ministers of the Interior of Greece
Finance ministers of Greece
Justice ministers of Greece
Ministers of Military Affairs of Greece
Burials at the First Cemetery of Athens
Speakers of the Hellenic Parliament
Maniots
People from Nafplion